Roland Salm (born 21 February 1950) is a former Swiss professional cyclist. He was the Swiss National Road Race champion in 1974, 1975, 1976 and 1977.

Palmares

1969
 Junior Road Champion
1972
1st Prologue Grand Prix Guillaume Tell (TTT)
1973
 National points race champion
1st Giro del Lagio Maggiore
1st stages 1 and 2
3rd Stausee-Rundfahrt Klingnau
1974
 National Road Race Champion
1st Tour de Berne
2nd Tour du Lac Léman
1975
 National Road Race Champion
1st Giro del Veneto
1st Stausee-Rundfahrt Klingnau
1st Tour du Leimenthal
1st Tour de Berne
2nd GP Montelupo
3rd Sassari-Cagliari
1976
 National Road Race Champion
2nd Tour Méditerranéen
3rd Tour de Berne
5th Tour de Romandie
1977
 National Road Race Champion
1st Rund um die Rigi - Gersau
3rd Grand Prix of Aargau Canton
1980
1st stage 7 Tour de Suisse
1981
1st Rund um die Rigi - Gersau

References

External links

1950 births
Living people
Swiss male cyclists
Tour de Suisse stage winners